"Bailar" is a song by Mexican-American DJ Deorro, featuring the vocals of Elvis Crespo. It was released as a single in 2016 and was a hit mainly in Europe. A remix of the song features rapper Pitbull.

Track listing
Digital download
 "Bailar" (feat. Pitbull & Elvis Crespo) — 2:40

Chart performance
"Bailar" performed well in Europe, charting in the top 40 of at least five countries there, while also charting in the top 40 of several U.S. Billboard charts, including the Hot Latin Songs chart at No. 8. The song was most successful in both the Netherlands and Spain, peaking at No. 3, while also reaching the number one spot in Israel.

Charts

Weekly charts

Year-end charts

Certifications

References

2016 songs
2016 singles
Deorro songs
Elvis Crespo songs
Pitbull (rapper) songs
Songs written by Elvis Crespo
Number-one singles in Israel
Sony Music Latin singles
Electro swing songs
Latin house songs